1,3,3,3-Tetrafluoropropene (HFO-1234ze(E), R-1234ze) is a hydrofluoroolefin. It was developed as a "fourth generation" refrigerant to replace fluids such as R-134a, as a blowing agent for foam and aerosol applications, and in air horns and gas dusters. The use of R-134a is being phased out because of its high global warming potential (GFA). HFO-1234ze(E) itself has zero ozone-depletion potential (ODP=0), a very low global warming potential (GWP < 1 ), even lower than CO, and it is classified by ANSI/ASHRAE as class A2L refrigerant (lower flammability and lower toxicity). In open atmosphere however, HFO-1234ze actually might form HFC-23 as one of its secondary atmospheric breakdown products. HFC-23 is a very potent greenhouse gas with a GWP100 of 14,800. The secondary GWP of R-1234ze would then be in the range of 1,400±700 considering the amount of HFC-23 which may form from HFO-1234ze in the atmosphere. Besides the global warming potential, when HFOs decompose in the atmosphere, trifluoroacetic acid (TFA(A)) is formed, which also remains in the atmosphere for several days. The trifluoroacetic acid then forms trifluoroacetate (TFA), a salt of trifluoroacetic acid, in water and on the ground. Due to its high polarity and low degradability, it is difficult to remove TFA from drinking water (ICPR 2019).

Uses
The increasing concerns about global warming and the related possible undesirable climate effects have led to an increasing agreement in developed countries for the reduction of greenhouse gas emissions. Given the relatively high global warming potential of most of the hydro-fluoro-carbons (HFCs), several actions are ongoing in different countries to reduce the use of these fluids. For example, the European Union's recent F-Gas regulation specifies the mandatory GWP values of the refrigerants to be used as working fluids in almost all air conditioners and refrigeration machines beginning in 2020.

Several types of possible replacement candidates have been proposed so far, both synthetic and natural. Among the synthetic options, hydro-fluoro-olefins (HFOs) are the ones appearing most promising thus far.

HFO-1234ze(E) has been adopted as a working fluid in chillers, heat pumps, and supermarket refrigeration systems. There are also plans to use it as a propellant in inhalers.

It has been demonstrated that HFO-1234ze(E) can not be considered as a drop-in replacement of HFC-134a. In fact, from a thermodynamic point of view, it can be stated that:

– The theoretical coefficients of performance of HFO-1234ze(E) is slightly lower than HFC-134a one;

– HFO-1234ze(E) has a different volumetric cooling capacity when compared to HFC-134a.

– HFO-1234ze(E) has saturation pressure drops higher than HFC-134a during two-phase heat transfer under the constraint of achieving the same heat transfer coefficient.

So, from a technological point of view, modifications to the condenser and evaporator designs and to compressor displacement are needed to achieve the same cooling capacity and energetic performance of HFC-134a.

See also
2,3,3,3-Tetrafluoropropene (HFO-1234yf)

References

Refrigerants
Organofluorides
Trifluoromethyl compounds